The BMW WR 750 was a supercharged racing motorcycle from BMW with two-cylinder, four-stroke flat twin engine starting production in the year 1929.

History
The idea to equip the flat twin engine with a supercharger came from the designer of the BMW R 37 race bike, Rudolf Schleicher. But after his departure from BMW, the concept was transferred to the racing mechanic Josef Hopf, closest confidant of Rudolf Schleicher, and the BMW works driver and German Champion of 1926 and 1927, Ernst Jakob Henne. The first engines ran on the test bench in 1928.

Races and record attempts
The WR 500 and WR 750 could not break the dominance of the English brands in the international racing. Success came with the next generation of supercharged BMWs, with the Type 255, which went on the hunt for records and racing successes beginning in 1935.

Record runs
The record runs with the bumper compressor engines were continued until 1934.

Design
The Werksrennmotorräder ("works racebikes", initialized WR) WR 500 and WR 750 designs were derived from the R 37.

Engine
The engine was a longitudinally mounted flat twin four-stroke engine with overhead valves. The compressor was located between the seat and gearbox and in the first version was driven by an additional open parallel shaft next to the magneto with a right-angle bevel gear linkage. Thus, the compressor shaft ran transversely to the direction of travel. The boost pressure was up to 2 bar depending on application. The tank was shortened compared to the series motorcycles to make room for the compressor. The single carburetor was located behind the compressor.

Starting in 1930 there was also a version with chain-driven compressor. The chain ran behind the cylinders under a highly modified engine cover, and drove the compressor shaft lying parallel to the direction of travel.

Drive
The WR 750 had a manual transmission with shaft drive on the right side of the unsprung rear wheel.

Suspension
The front fork utilized a leading link fork, suspended by two leaf spring assemblies. The brakes were considerably enlarged and improved from those furnished on the production motorcycles.

See also
List of motorcycles of the 1920s
List of motorcycles of the 1930s
List of motorcycles by type of engine
Motorcycle land-speed record

References

External links

WR 750
Land speed record motorcycles